Eastpointe Community Schools (formerly East Detroit Public Schools) is a school district headquartered in Eastpointe, Michigan, United States in Metro Detroit. The district serves Eastpointe and a portion of Warren.

History

In a four-year period until 2012 the district lost 1,400 students. In 2012 it had $4.2 million fewer dollars in operating revenue than it did in 2011. In 2012 the district had 3,500 students. During that year the district opened up a school of choice program for grades K-8 so that anyone from Macomb County may apply to attend East Detroit schools.

On November 8, 2013, David Zauner, a teacher at East Detroit High School, dove into a pool to rescue a 14-year-old student who was drowning. The boy died in the hospital four days later. In June 2014 Zauner accused the school district and John Rizzo, the school's assistant principal and athletic director, of retaliating against him for cooperating with a police investigation about the incident; Zauner is suing the district and Rizzo.

On July 1, 2017, the East Detroit Public Schools changed its name to Eastpointe Community Schools to align with the name of the community. Along with the change in district name, the High School, Middle School, and Kellwood Alternative Center were also changed to align with the new district name. In addition, the Eastpointe Community Schools have added an Early Learning Center to promote early childhood education.

Schools

Secondary schools
Eastpointe Alternative Center
Eastpointe High School
 Eastpointe Middle School

Elementary schools

Elementary schools (K-2)
 Crescentwood Elementary School 
 Forest Park Elementary School

Elementary schools (3-5)
 Bellview Elementary School
 Pleasantview Elementary School

Early Learning
 Eastpointe Early Learning Center

Former Schools
 Grant Junior High School
 Oakwood Middle School
 Kantner Elementary School
 Roosevelt Elementary School
 Warrendale Elementary School
 Woodland Elementary School
 Kellwood Elementary School
 Kern Elementary School
 Deerfield Elementary School
 Roxana Park Elementary School

References

External links

 Eastpointe Community Schools

School districts in Michigan
Education in Macomb County, Michigan
Warren, Michigan
2017 establishments in Michigan